La Bonne Chanson is a Canadian publishing and independent record label that is "dedicated to the dissemination of French and French-Canadian songs of quality". It was founded in Saint-Hyacinthe, Quebec, Canada in 1937 by Charles-Émile Gadbois.

References

Publishing companies established in 1937
Canadian independent record labels
Music publishing companies of Canada
Sheet music publishing companies
Record labels established in 1937
Companies based in Saint-Hyacinthe